Tambohorano is a town and commune on the west coast of Madagascar approximately 290 kilometres north-west of the capital Antananarivo.. It belongs to the district of Maintirano, which is a part of Melaky Region. The population of the commune was estimated to be approximately 8,000 in 2001 commune census.

Tambohorano is served by a local airport and maritime harbour. Primary and junior level secondary education are available in town. The majority 65% of the population of the commune are farmers, while an additional 20% receives their livelihood from raising livestock. The most important crop is rice, while other important products are wheat, coconuts, cassava and barley.  Services provide employment for 5% of the population. Additionally fishing employs 10% of the population.

References and notes 

Populated places in Melaky